Forfar  is the county town of Angus, Scotland.

Forfar may also refer to:

Forfar (UK Parliament constituency), a former county constituency in Scotland
Earl of Forfar, a peerage title
HMS Forfar, two Royal Navy ships

People with the surname
John Forfar (1916–2013), British paediatrician and academic
Ronald Forfar, British actor